Molly Chacko (born 15 May 1969) is an Indian middle distance runner from Kerala. She holds the current 3000 metres National record of 9:06.42 set on 10 October 1994 during the Hiroshima Asian Games. Molly is also a former National record holder in the 1500 metres. She set the 1500 m record in 1994 with a run of 4:12.01. This record was later broken by Sunita Rani in August 1999.

Molly is married to former Indian swimmer Sebastian Xavier and the couple is working with Southern Railways.

References

External links

All Athletics profile

Living people
1969 births
Malayali people
Sportswomen from Kerala
Indian female middle-distance runners
20th-century Indian women
20th-century Indian people
Athletes (track and field) at the 1994 Asian Games
Asian Games competitors for India